Chah Dasht Rural District is a rural district (dehestan) in Shara District, Hamadan County, Hamadan Province, Iran. At the 2006 census, its population was 6,708, in 1,481 families. The rural district has 12 villages.

References 

Rural Districts of Hamadan Province
Hamadan County